The British Overseas Territories (BOTs), also known as the United Kingdom Overseas Territories (UKOTs), are fourteen territories with a constitutional and historical link with the United Kingdom. They are the last remnants of the former British Empire and do not form part of the United Kingdom itself. The permanently inhabited territories are internally self-governing, with the United Kingdom retaining responsibility for defence and foreign relations. Three of the territories are inhabited, chiefly or only, by a transitory population of military or scientific personnel. All but one of the rest are listed by the UN Special Committee on Decolonization as non-self-governing territories. All fourteen have the British monarch as head of state. These UK government responsibilities are assigned to various departments of the Foreign and Commonwealth Office and are subject to change.

Current overseas territories 
The fourteen British Overseas Territories are:

Map

Collective titles

The term British Overseas Territory was introduced by the British Overseas Territories Act 2002, replacing the term British Dependent Territory.  Prior to 1 January 1983, the territories were officially referred to as British Crown Colonies.

Although the Crown Dependencies of Jersey, Guernsey, and the Isle of Man are also under the sovereignty of the British monarch, they are in a different constitutional relationship with the United Kingdom. The British Overseas Territories and Crown Dependencies are themselves distinct from the Commonwealth realms, a group of 15 independent countries (including the United Kingdom) each having the British monarch as their reigning monarch, and from the Commonwealth of Nations, a voluntary association of 56 countries mostly with historic links to the British Empire (which also includes all Commonwealth realms). Notably, while not independent Commonwealth realms, the territories are separately represented at the Commonwealth Games on the same basis as independent nation members, as are the three Crown Dependencies of Jersey, Guernsey and Isle of Man.

Population
With the exceptions of the British Antarctic Territory, the South Georgia and the South Sandwich Islands (which host only officials and research station staff) and the British Indian Ocean Territory (used as a military base), the territories retain permanent civilian populations. Permanent residency for the approximately 7,000 civilians living in the Sovereign Base Areas of Akrotiri and Dhekelia is limited to citizens of the Republic of Cyprus.

The vast majority of this land area constitutes the almost uninhabited British Antarctic Territory (the land area of all the territories excepting the Antarctic territory is only ), while the two largest territories by population, the Cayman Islands and Bermuda, account for about half of the total BOT population. The Cayman Islands alone accounts for 28% of the entire BOT population. At the other end of the scale, three territories have no civilian inhabitants - the Antarctic Territory (currently consisting of five research stations), the British Indian Ocean Territory (whose inhabitants were forcibly moved to Mauritius and the United Kingdom between 1968 and 1973), and South Georgia (which actually did have a full-time population of 2 between 1992 and 2006). Pitcairn Islands, settled by the survivors of the Mutiny on the Bounty, is the smallest settled territory with 49 inhabitants (all of whom live on the titular island), while the smallest by land area is Gibraltar on the southern tip of the Iberian Peninsula. The United Kingdom participates in the Antarctic Treaty System and, as part of a mutual agreement, the British Antarctic Territory is recognised by four of the six other sovereign nations making claims to Antarctic territory.

History 

Early colonies, in the sense of English subjects residing in lands hitherto outside the control of the English government, were generally known as plantations.

The first, unofficial, colony was Newfoundland, where English fishermen routinely set up seasonal camps in the 16th century. It is now a province of Canada known as Newfoundland and Labrador. It retains strong cultural ties with Britain.

After failed attempts, including the Roanoke Colony, permanent English colonisation of North America began officially in 1607 with the settlement of Jamestown, the first successful permanent colony in Virginia (a term that was then applied generally to North America). Its offshoot, Bermuda, was settled inadvertently after the wrecking of the Virginia Company's flagship there in 1609, with the company's charter extended to officially include the archipelago in 1612. St. George's town, founded in Bermuda in that year, remains the oldest continuously inhabited British settlement in the New World (with some historians stating that – its formation predating the 1619 conversion of James Fort into Jamestown – St. George's was actually the first successful town the English established in the New World). Bermuda and Bermudians have played important, sometimes pivotal, but generally underestimated or unacknowledged roles in the shaping of the English and British transatlantic empires. These include maritime commerce, settlement of the continent and of the West Indies, and the projection of naval power via the colony's privateers, among other areas.

The growth of the British Empire in the 19th century, to its territorial peak in the 1920s, saw Britain acquire nearly one quarter of the world's land mass, including territories with large indigenous populations in Asia and Africa. From the mid-nineteenth century to the early twentieth century, the larger settler colonies – in Canada, Australia, New Zealand and South Africa – first became self-governing colonies and then achieved independence in all matters except foreign policy, defence and trade. Separate self-governing colonies federated to become Canada (in 1867), Australia (in 1901), South Africa (in 1910), and Rhodesia (in 1965). These and other large self-governing colonies had become known as dominions by the 1920s. The dominions achieved almost full independence with the Statute of Westminster (1931).Through a process of decolonisation following the Second World War, most of the British colonies in Africa, Asia and the Caribbean chose independence. Some colonies became Commonwealth realms, retaining the British monarch as their own head of state. Most former colonies and protectorates became member states of the Commonwealth of Nations, a non-political, voluntary association of equal members, comprising a population of around 2.2 billion people.

After the independence of Southern Rhodesia (now Zimbabwe) in Africa in 1980 and British Honduras (now Belize) in Central America in 1981, the last major colony that remained was Hong Kong, with a population of over 5 million. With 1997 approaching, the United Kingdom and China negotiated the Sino-British Joint Declaration, which led to the whole of Hong Kong becoming a special administrative region of China in 1997, subject to various conditions intended to guarantee the preservation of Hong Kong's capitalist economy and its way of life under British rule for at least 50 years after the handover. George Town, Cayman Islands has consequently become the largest city among the dependent territories, partly because of the constant and healthy flow of immigration to the city and the territory as a whole, which saw its population jump 26% from 2010 to 2021, the fastest population growth of any of the territories.

In 2002, the British Parliament passed the British Overseas Territories Act 2002. This reclassified the UK's dependent territories as overseas territories and, with the exception of those people solely connected with the Sovereign Base Areas on Cyprus, restored full British citizenship to their inhabitants.

During the European Union (EU) membership of the United Kingdom, the main body of EU law did not apply and, although certain slices of EU law were applied to the overseas territories as part of the EU's Association of Overseas Countries and Territories (OCT Association), they were not commonly enforceable in local courts. The OCT Association also provided overseas territories with structural funding for regeneration projects. Gibraltar was the only overseas territory that was part of the EU, although it was not part of the European Customs Union, the European Tax Policy, the European Statistics Zone or the Common Agriculture Policy. Gibraltar was not a member of the EU in its own right, having had its representation in the European Parliament through its members from South West England. Overseas citizens held concurrent European Union citizenship, having given them rights of free movement across all EU member states.

The Sovereign Base Areas in Cyprus were never part of the EU, but they are the only British overseas territory to use the Euro as official currency, having previously had the Cypriot pound as their currency until 1 January 2008.

Government

Head of state 
The head of state in the overseas territories is the British monarch, currently King Charles III. The monarch appoints a representative in each territory to exercise his or her executive power. In territories with a permanent population, a governor is appointed by the monarch on the advice of the British government. Currently (2019) all but two governors are either career diplomats or have worked in other civil service departments. The remaining two governors are former members of the British armed forces. In territories without a permanent population, a commissioner is usually appointed to represent the monarch. Exceptionally, in the overseas territories of Saint Helena, Ascension, Tristan da Cunha and the Pitcairn Islands, an administrator is appointed to be the governor's representative. In the territory of Saint Helena, Ascension and Tristan da Cunha, there is an administrator in each of the two distant parts of the territory, namely Ascension Island and Tristan da Cunha. The administrator of the Pitcairn Islands resides on Pitcairn, with the governor based in New Zealand.

Following the Lords' decision in Ex parte Quark, 2005, it is held that the King in exercising his authority over British Overseas Territories does not act on the advice of the government of the UK, but in his role as king of each territory, with the exception of fulfilling the UK's international responsibilities for its territories. The reserve powers of the Crown for each territory are no longer considered to be exercisable on the advice of the UK government. To comply with the court's decision, the territorial governors now act on the advice of each territory's executive and the UK government can no longer disallow legislation passed by territorial legislatures.

The role of the governor is to act as the de facto head of state, and they are usually responsible for appointing the head of government, and senior political positions in the territory. The governor is also responsible for liaising with the UK government, and carrying out any ceremonial duties. A commissioner has the same powers as a governor, but also acts as the head of government.

Local government

Although the British Government is the national government, much of governance within the territories has been delegated to local government, with all of those that have permanent populations having some degree of representative government (which was not the case for British Hong Kong) which have been delegated responsibility for local legislation (although the inhabitants of the first colony established, Virginia (including Bermuda from 1612), were in 1606 (a century before the Kingdom of England and the Kingdom of Scotland united to form the Kingdom of Great Britain)), irrevocably guaranteed the same rights and representation they would have if born in England, representation in the national Parliament of the United Kingdom has yet to be extended to any overseas territory. The structure of the territorial government appears to be closely correlated to the size and political development of the territory.

Legal system
Each overseas territory has its own legal system independent of the United Kingdom. The legal system is generally based on English common law, with some distinctions for local circumstances. Each territory has its own attorney general, and court system. For the smaller territories, the United Kingdom may appoint a UK-based lawyer or judge to work on legal cases. This is particularly important for cases involving serious crimes and where it is impossible to find a jury who will not know the defendant in a small population island.

The Pitcairn sexual assault trial of 2004 is an example of how the United Kingdom may choose to provide the legal framework for particular cases where the territory cannot do so alone.

The highest court for all the British overseas territories is the Judicial Committee of the Privy Council in London.

Police and enforcement
The British overseas territories generally look after their own policing matters and have their own police forces. In smaller territories, the senior officer(s) may be recruited or seconded from a UK police force, and specialist staff and equipment may be sent to assist the local force.

Some territories may have other forces beyond the main territorial police, for instance an airport police, such as Airport Security Police (Bermuda), or a defence police force, such as the Gibraltar Defence Police. In addition, most territories have customs, immigration, border, and coastguard agencies.

Territories with military bases or responsibilities may also have "Overseas Service Police", members of the British or Commonwealth Armed Forces.

Joint Ministerial Council

A Joint Ministerial Council of UK ministers, and the leaders of the overseas territories has been held annually since 2012 to provide representation between UK government departments and overseas territory governments.

Disputed sovereignty

The British Indian Ocean Territory (BIOT) is the subject of a territorial dispute with Mauritius, the government of which claims that the separation of the Chagos Archipelago from the rest of British Mauritius in 1965, three years before Mauritius was granted independence from the United Kingdom, was not lawful. The long-running dispute was referred in 2017 to the International Court of Justice, which issued an advisory opinion on 25 February 2019 which supported the position of the government of Mauritius.

The British Antarctic Territory has some overlap with territorial claims by both Argentina and Chile. However, territorial claims on the continent may not currently be advanced, under the holding measures of the Antarctic Treaty System.

United Nations list of non-self-governing territories
Of the eleven territories with a permanent population, all except the Sovereign Base Areas of Akrotiri and Dhekelia in Cyprus continue to be listed by the UN Special Committee on Decolonization as non-self-governing territories since they were listed as dependent territories by the UK when it joined the UN in 1947. This means that the UK remains  the official administrative power of these territories, and under Article 73 is therefore required "to develop self-government, to take due account of the political aspirations of the peoples, and to assist them in the progressive development of their free political institutions."

Relations with the United Kingdom 

Historically the Secretary of State for the Colonies and the Colonial Office were responsible for overseeing all British Colonies, but today the Foreign, Commonwealth and Development Office (FCDO) has the responsibility of looking after the interests of all overseas territories except the Sovereign Base Areas of Akrotiri and Dhekelia, which comes under the jurisdiction of the Ministry of Defence. Within the FCDO, the general responsibility for the territories is handled by the Overseas Territories Directorate.

In 2012, the FCO published The Overseas Territories: security, success and sustainability which set out Britain's policy for the Overseas Territories, covering six main areas:
 Defence, security and safety of the territories and their people
 Successful and resilient economies
 Cherishing the environment
 Making government work better
 Vibrant and flourishing communities
 Productive links with the wider world

Britain and the overseas territories do not have diplomatic representations, although the governments of the overseas territories with indigenous populations all retain a representative office in London. The United Kingdom Overseas Territories Association (UKOTA) also represents the interests of the territories in London. The governments in both London and territories occasionally meet to mitigate or resolve disagreements over the process of governance in the territories and levels of autonomy.

Britain provides financial assistance to the overseas territories via the FCDO (previously the Department for International Development). As of 2019, only Montserrat, Saint Helena, Pitcairn and Tristan da Cunha receive budgetary aid (i.e. financial contribution to recurrent funding). Several specialist funds are made available by the UK, including:
 The Good Government Fund which provides assistance on government administration;
 The Economic Diversification Programme Budget which aim to diversify and enhance the economic bases of the territories.

The territories have no official representation in the UK Parliament, but have informal representation through the All-Party Parliamentary Group, and can petition the UK government through the Directgov e-Petitions website.

Two national parties, UKIP and the Liberal Democrats, have endorsed calls for direct representation of overseas territories in the UK Parliament, as well as backbench members of the Conservative Party and Labour Party.

Andrew Rosindell, MP for Romford, is an advocate of reserving seats in the British House of Commons for the British Overseas Territories, especially for the Falkland Islands and Gibraltar.

Foreign affairs 

Foreign affairs of the overseas territories are handled by the FCDO in London. Some territories maintain diplomatic officers in nearby countries for trade and immigration purposes. Several of the territories in the Americas maintain membership within the Organisation of Eastern Caribbean States, the Caribbean Community, the Caribbean Development Bank, Caribbean Disaster Emergency Management Agency, and the Association of Caribbean States. The territories are members of the Commonwealth of Nations through the United Kingdom. The inhabited territories compete in their own right at the Commonwealth Games, and three of the territories (Bermuda, the Cayman Islands and the British Virgin Islands) sent teams to the 2016 Summer Olympics.

Full British citizenship has been granted to most 'belongers' of overseas territories (mainly since the British Overseas Territories Act 2002).

Most countries do not recognise the sovereignty claims of any other country, including Britain's, to Antarctica and its off-shore islands. Five nations contest, with counter-claims, the UK's sovereignty in the following overseas territories:
 British Antarctic Territory – Territory overlaps Antarctic claims made by Chile and Argentina
 British Indian Ocean Territory – claimed by Mauritius
 Falkland Islands – claimed by Argentina
 Gibraltar – border disputed by Spain
 South Georgia and the South Sandwich Islands – claimed by Argentina

Citizenship 

The people of the British Overseas Territories are British Nationals. Most of the overseas territories distinguish between those British nationals who have rights reserved under the local government for those with a qualifying connection to the territory. In Bermuda, by example, this is called Bermudian status, and can be inherited or obtained subject to conditions laid down by the local government (non-British nationals must necessarily obtain British nationality in order to obtain Bermudian status). Although the expression "belonger status" is not used in Bermuda, it is used elsewhere in Wikipedia to refer to all such statuses of various of the British Overseas Territories collectively. This status is neither a nationality nor a citizenship, though it confers rights under local legislation.

Prior to 1968, the British government made no citizenship (or connected rights) distinction between its nationals in the United Kingdom and those in the British colonies (as the British Overseas Territories were then termed). Indeed, the people of Bermuda had been explicitly guaranteed by Royal Charters for the Virginia Company in 1607 (extended to Bermuda in 1612) and the Somers Isles Company (in 1615) that they and their descendants would have exactly the same rights as they would if they had they been born in England. Despite this, British Colonials without a qualifying connection to the United Kingdom were stripped of the rights of abode and free entry in 1968, and in 1983 the British government replaced Citizen of the United Kingdom and Colonies with British Citizenship (with rights of abode and free entry to the United Kingdom) for those with a qualifying connection to the United Kingdom or British Dependent Territories Citizenship for those with a connection only to a colony, at the same time re-designated a British Dependent Territory. This category of citizenship was distinguished from British Citizenship by what it did not include, the rights of abode and free entry to the United Kingdom, and was not specific to any colony but to all collectively, except for Gibraltar and the Falklands Islands, the people of which retained British Citizenship.

It was stated by some Conservative Party backbench MPs that the secret intent of the Conservative government was to restore a single citizenship with full rights across the United Kingdom and the British Dependent Territories once Hong Kong and its British Dependent Territories Citizens had been returned to the People's Republic of China in 1997. By that time, the Labour Party was in government with Tony Blair as Prime Minister. Labour had decried discrimination against the people of the British Dependent Territories (other than those of Gibraltar and the Falklands), which was understood universally as intended to raise a colour bar, and had done so given that most white colonials were not affected by it, and had made restoration of a single citizenship part of its election manifesto.

In 2002, when the British Dependent Territories became the British Overseas Territories, the default citizenship was renamed British Overseas Territories Citizenship (except still for Gibraltar and the Falkland Islands, for which British Citizenship remained the default), the immigration bars against its holders were lowered, and its holders were also entitled to obtain British Citizenship by obtaining a second British Passport (something that had previously been illegal) with the citizenship so indicated. As British Overseas Territories Citizens must provide their British Passport with the citizenship shown as British Overseas Territories Citizen in order to prove their entitlement to obtain a passport with the citizenship shown as British Citizen, most now have two passports, though the local governments of the territories do not distinguish an individual's local status based on either form of citizenship, and the passport with the citizenship shown as British Citizen consequently shows the holder to be entitled to all of the same right as does the passport with the citizenship shown as British Overseas Territories Citizen, and is often required to access services in the United Kingdom, and is accepted by the immigration authorities of more foreign countries, many of which have barriers against holders of British Overseas Territories Citizen passport holders that do not apply to British Citizen passport holders (the exception being the United States in relation to Bermuda, with which it has retained close links since Bermuda was founded as an extension of Virginia).

In regard to movement within British sovereign territory, only British citizenship grants the right of abode in a specific country or territory, namely, the United Kingdom proper (which includes its three Crown dependencies). Individual overseas territories have legislative independence over immigration, and consequently, BOTC status, as noted above, does not automatically grant the right of abode in any of the territories, as it depends on the territory's immigration laws. A territory may issue belonger status to allow a person to reside in the territory that they have close links with. The governor or immigration department of a territory may also grant the territorial status to a resident who does not hold it as a birthright.

From 1949 to 1983, the nationality status of Citizenship of UK and Colonies (CUKC) was shared by residents of the UK proper and residents of overseas territories, although most residents of overseas territories lost their automatic right to live in the UK after the ratification of Commonwealth Immigrants Act 1968 that year unless they were born in the UK proper or had a parent or a grandparent born in the UK. In 1983, CUKC status of residents of overseas territories without the right of abode in the UK was replaced by British Dependent Territories citizenship (BDTC) in the newly minted British Nationality Act 1981, a status that does not come with it the right of abode in the UK or any overseas territory. For these residents, registration as full British citizens then required physical residence in the UK proper. There were only two exceptions: Falkland Islanders, who were automatically granted British citizenship and was treated as a part of the UK proper through the enactment of British Nationality (Falkland Islands) Act 1983 due to the Falklands War with Argentina, and Gibraltarians who were given the special entitlement to be registered as British citizens upon request without further conditions because of its individual membership in the European Economic Area and the European Community.

Five years after the handover of Hong Kong to China in 1997, the British government amended the 1981 Act to give British citizenship without restrictions to all BDTCs (the status was also renamed BOTC at the same time) except for those solely connected with Akrotiri and Dhekelia (whose residents already held Cypriot citizenship). This restored the right of abode in the UK to residents of overseas territories after a 34-year hiatus from 1968 to 2002.

Military 

Defence of the overseas territories is the responsibility of the United Kingdom. Many of the overseas territories are used as military bases by the United Kingdom- and its allies.

 Ascension Island (part of Saint Helena, Ascension and Tristan da Cunha) – the base known as RAF Ascension Island is used by both the Royal Air Force and the United States Air Force.
 Bermuda – became the primary Royal Navy base in North America, following US independence, and designated an Imperial fortress. The naval establishment included an admiralty, a dockyard, and a naval squadron. A considerable military garrison was built up to protect it, and Bermuda, which the British government came to see as a base, rather than as a colony, was known as Fortress Bermuda, and the Gibraltar of the West (Bermudians, like Gibraltarians, also dub their territory "The Rock"). Canada and the United States also established bases in Bermuda during the Second World War, which were maintained through the Cold War. Four air bases were located in Bermuda during the Second World War (operated by the Royal Air Force, Royal Navy, US Navy, and US Army/Army Air Force). Since 1995, the naval and military force in Bermuda has been reduced to the local territorial battalion, the Royal Bermuda Regiment.
 British Indian Ocean Territory – the island of Diego Garcia is home to a large naval base and airbase leased to the United States by the United Kingdom until 2036 (unless renewed). There are British forces in small numbers in the BIOT for administrative and immigration purposes.
 Falkland Islands – the British Forces Falkland Islands includes commitments from the British Army, Royal Air Force and Royal Navy, along with the Falkland Islands Defence Force.
 Gibraltar – Historically designated (along with Bermuda, Malta, and Halifax, Nova Scotia) as an Imperial fortress. British Forces Gibraltar includes a Royal Navy dockyard (also used by NATO), RAF Gibraltar – used by the RAF and NATO and a local garrison – the Royal Gibraltar Regiment.
 The Sovereign Base Areas of Akrotiri and Dhekelia in Cyprus – maintained as strategic British military bases in the eastern Mediterranean Sea.
 Montserrat – the Royal Montserrat Defence Force, historically connected with the Irish Guards, is a body of twenty volunteers, whose duties are primarily ceremonial.
Cayman Islands - The Cayman Islands Regiment is the home defence unit of the Cayman Islands. It is a single territorial infantry battalion of the British Armed Forces that was formed in 2020.
Turks and Caicos - The Turks and Caicos Regiment is the home defence unit of the British Overseas Territory of the Turks and Caicos Islands. It is a single territorial infantry battalion of the British Armed Forces that was formed in 2020, similar to the Cayman Regiment.

Languages 

Most of the languages other than English spoken in the territories contain a large degree of English, either as a root language, or in codeswitching, e.g. Llanito. They include:

Llanito or Yanito and Spanish (Gibraltar)
Cayman Creole (Cayman Islands)
Turks-Caicos Creole (Turks and Caicos Islands)
Pitkern (Pitcairn Islands)
Greek (Akrotiri and Dhekelia)

Forms of English:
Bermudian English (Bermuda)
Falkland Islands English

Currencies 

The 14 British overseas territories use a varied assortment of currencies, including the Euro, British pound, United States dollar, New Zealand dollar, or their own currencies, which may be pegged to one of these.

 Part of the British Overseas Territory of Saint Helena, Ascension and Tristan da Cunha.

Symbols and insignia 

Each overseas territory has been granted its own flag and coat of arms by the British monarch. Traditionally, the flags follow the Blue Ensign design, with the Union Flag in the canton, and the territory's coat of arms in the fly. Exceptions to this are Bermuda which uses a Red Ensign; British Antarctic Territory which uses a White Ensign, but without the overall cross of St. George; British Indian Ocean Territory which uses a Blue Ensign with wavy lines to symbolise the sea; and Gibraltar which uses a banner of its coat of arms (the flag of the city of Gibraltar).

Akrotiri and Dhekelia and Saint Helena, Ascension and Tristan da Cunha are the only British overseas territories without their own flag, though Saint Helena, Ascension Island and Tristan da Cunha have their own individual flags. Only the Union Flag, which is the national flag in all the territories, is used in these territories.

Sports 
Bermuda, the British Virgin Islands and the Cayman Islands are the only British Overseas Territories with recognised National Olympic Committees (NOCs); the British Olympic Association is recognised as the appropriate NOC for athletes from the other territories, and thus athletes who hold a British passport are eligible to represent Great Britain at the Olympic Games.

Shara Proctor from Anguilla, Delano Williams from the Turks and Caicos Islands, Jenaya Wade-Fray from Bermuda and Georgina Cassar from Gibraltar strove to represent Team GB at the London 2012 Olympics. Proctor, Wade-Fray and Cassar qualified for Team GB, with Williams missing the cut, however wishing to represent the UK in 2016.

The Gibraltar national football team was accepted into UEFA in 2013 in time for the 2016 European Championships. It has been accepted by FIFA and went into the 2018 FIFA World Cup qualifying, where they achieved 0 points.

Gibraltar has hosted and competed in the Island Games, most recently in 2019.

Biodiversity 

The British Overseas Territories have more biodiversity than the entire UK mainland. There are at least 180 endemic plant species in the overseas territories as opposed to only 12 on the UK mainland. Responsibility for protection of biodiversity and meeting obligations under international environmental conventions is shared between the UK Government and the local governments of the territories.

Two areas, Henderson Island in the Pitcairn Islands as well as the Gough and Inaccessible Islands of Tristan Da Cunha are listed as UNESCO World Heritage Sites, and two other territories, the Turks and Caicos Islands, and Saint Helena are on the United Kingdom's tentative list for future UNESCO World Heritage Sites. Gibraltar's Gorham's Cave Complex is also found on the UK's tentative UNESCO World Heritage Site list.

The three regions of biodiversity hotspots situated in the British Overseas Territories are the Caribbean Islands, the Mediterranean Basin and the Oceania ecozone in the Pacific.

The UK created the largest continuous marine protected areas in the world, the Chagos Marine Protected Area, and announced in 2015 funding to establish a new, larger, reserve around the Pitcairn Islands.

In January 2016, the UK government announced the intention to create a marine protected area around Ascension Island. The protected area would be 234,291 square kilometres, half of which would be closed to fishing.

See also 

 British overseas territory citizens in the mainland United Kingdom
 Colonial Department
 Depopulation of Chagossians from the Chagos Archipelago to enable building of a UK-US military base in the British Indian Ocean Territory on Diego Garcia
 List of British Army installations
 List of leaders of Overseas Territories
 List of stock exchanges in the United Kingdom, the British Crown Dependencies and United Kingdom Overseas Territories
 List of universities in British Overseas Territories
 List of postcodes in Overseas Territories
 Secretary of State for the Colonies
 Tax haven lists
 UK Overseas Territories Conservation Forum
 United Kingdom Overseas Territories Association (UKOTA)
 Overseas France

Notes

References

Further reading 
 Charles Cawley. Colonies in Conflict: The History of the British Overseas Territories (2015) 444pp
 Harry Ritchie, The Last Pink Bits: Travels Through the Remnants of the British Empire (London: Hodder & Stoughton, 1997)
 Simon Winchester, Outposts: Journeys to the Surviving Relics of the British Empire (London & New York, 1985)
 George Drower, Britain's Dependent Territories (Dartmouth, 1992)
 George Drower, Overseas Territories Handbook (London: TSO, 1998)
 Ian Hendry and Susan Dickson, "British Overseas Territories Law" (London: Hart Publishing, 2011)
 Ben Fogle, The Teatime Islands: Adventures in Britain's Faraway Outposts (London: Michael Joseph, 2003)

External links 

 Foreign and Commonwealth Office – UK Overseas Territories
 United Kingdom Overseas Territories Association
 British Overseas Territories Act 2002 – Text of the Act

 
British colonization of the Americas
Foreign relations of the United Kingdom
Dependent territories of European countries
Governance of the British Empire
History of the British Empire
History of the Commonwealth of Nations
1983 establishments in British Overseas Territories